Mohd Solihan bin Badri is a Malaysian politician who has served as Member of the Johor State Executive Council (EXCO) in the Barisan Nasional (BN) and Pakatan Harapan (PH) state administrations under former Menteris Besar Hasni Mohammad and Sahruddin Jamal from March 2020 to March 2022 and from April 2019 to the collapse of the PH state administration in February 2020. He served as Member of the Johor State Legislative Assembly (MLA) for Tenang from May 2018 to March 2022. He is a member of the Malaysian United Indigenous Party (BERSATU), a component party of the ruling Perikatan Nasional (PN) coalition which is aligned with BN coalition and a former component party of the PH opposition coalition.

Election Results

References 

Living people
People from Johor
Malaysian people of Malay descent
Malaysian Muslims
Malaysian United Indigenous Party politicians
21st-century Malaysian politicians
Year of birth missing (living people)
Members of the Johor State Legislative Assembly
Johor state executive councillors